Óscar Ruiz may refer to:
 Óscar Ruiz (referee), Colombian football referee
 Óscar Ruiz (footballer), Paraguayan footballer